The external pudendal veins (deep pudendal & superficial pudendal) are veins of the pelvis which drain into the great saphenous vein.

Additional Images

See also
 Internal pudendal veins

Veins of the lower limb